The Aprilia RS125 is a GP derived replica sport production motorcycle.  It is powered by a Rotax single cylinder 124.8 cc two-stroke engine with Nikasil coated aluminium cylinder block, and liquid cooling.

Generations

RS125 Extrema/Replica 1992 to 1995 

Aprilia introduced the first RS125 in 1992. It has an angular tail section and swept front fairing, square cut headlight unit, three spoke rims, air scoops on the upper front middle fairing, Electric starter or kick start on the left hand side and analogue gauges. There was only one model variant in this year range which denoted RS 125 R on the tank and was red and black in colour. Production was late 1993/94

RS125 1996 to 1998

The RS125 is revised and the Extrema wording is dropped.  The RS retains a lot of the appearances of the previous RS but there are some notable differences.  The first one is a new engine, the Rotax 122, a new improved version to the previous one. The front air intakes are integrated into the front upper portion of the middle fairing.  The headlight unit is rounded and the lip is introduced to the top centre.  A digital gauge is added in place of the temperature gauge.

RS125 1999 to 2005

The RS125 was revised again in 1999 with more rounded and bulbous fairings, five spoke rims and a single air duct on the driver's right hand side. The lip on the headlight unit is increased in size.

RS125 2006 to 2012

The RS125 was given completely new fairing styling similar to the RSV 1000R. It has angular fairings, two headlight bulbs, a digital gauge, and multispoke Marchesini-styled rims.

Aprilia changed to radial four-piston brake calipers and added braided brake lines.

In 2008, Aprilia changed the electronics from Nippon-Denso to Piaggio/EFI Technolog electronics, and changed to a new ECU to meet the more stringent EURO3 emissions standards.

The bike also has a vacuum fuel tap on the tank and a new Dell'orto 28 mm VHST carburetor that has the vacuum pipe extension.

The line was dropped in 2012 to make way for the new RS4 125, going from a two-stroke to a single-cylinder four-stroke fuel injected system.

Tuono 2003 to 2005

The RS125 Tuono was introduced in 2003 as a semi naked version of the RS125. Production ran until 2005 and was subsequently dropped from the line-up.

The Tuono was essentially an RS125 with the middle and lower portions of the fairings absent and a handlebar fitted on the top yoke.

Notes

External links 
 RS 125 Official site.

RS125
Sport bikes
Motorcycles introduced in 1992
Two-stroke motorcycles